"Snapping" is a song by South Korean singer Chungha released on June 24, 2019, by MNH Entertainment, Stone Music Entertainment. The track acts as the title track for her Korean fourth extended play Flourishing, which was released simultaneously with the single. As of February 2021, it has over 75 million views on YouTube and 80 million streams on Spotify. "Snapping" placed first on the music show, Show Champion on July 3, 2019.

Background and composition
It was announced in June that Chungha will be making her third summer comeback. Music and photo teasers were released weeks before the official released of the single.

"Snapping" was written by Park Woo-sang. "Snapping" is a Latin-inspired pop song with an intense, seductive number that diverges from Chungha's previous summer singles such as "Love You", a track of "Blooming Blue", dropped in July last year. The lyrics talk about the uncomfortable end of a relationship. Like a magic spell, the snap of a finger is what you need to empty your mind and welcome another new day.

Music video and promotion
The music video was released alongside the album and song on June 24, 2019. The music video includes a creation of seductive and tantalizing with dynamic choreography and bright block-colored cinematography. It was directed by Rima Yoon and Dongju Jang. "Snapping" had its debut showcase on the day of the release, in Sogang University.

Accolades

Chart performance

Weekly charts

Year-end charts

Release history

See also
 List of Inkigayo Chart winners (2019)
 List of M Countdown Chart winners (2019)

References

2019 songs
2019 singles
Chungha songs
MNH Entertainment singles
Korean-language songs